Alcidion quadriguttatum is a species of longhorn beetles of the subfamily Lamiinae. It was described by Per Olof Christopher Aurivillius in 1920 and is known from Brazil.

References

Beetles described in 1920
Endemic fauna of Brazil
Alcidion